USA-282, also known as SBIRS GEO-4, is a United States military satellite and part of the Space-Based Infrared System.

Overview 
The SBIRS program was designed to provide a seamless operational transition from DSP to SBIRS and meet jointly-defined requirements of the defense and intelligence communities in support of the missile early warning, missile defense, battlespace awareness and technical intelligence mission areas.

The SBIRS satellites are a replacement for the Defense Support Program (DSP) early warning system. They are intended to detect ballistic missile launches, as well as various other events in the infrared spectrum, including nuclear explosions, aircraft flights, space object entries and reentries, wildfires and spacecraft launches.

Satellite description 
SBIRS GEO-4 was manufactured by Lockheed Martin Space, at production facility in Sunnyvale, California, and is built upon the A2100M satellite bus. The Atlas V launch vehicle used for SBIRS GEO-4 flew with a strap-on booster, a different configuration from the previous three SBIRS GEO launches. This was done as part of a space debris mitigation effort, to allow the Centaur upper stage to preserve sufficient fuel for a deorbit burn.

Launch 
SBIRS GEO-4 was the third geostationary SBIRS satellite to be built, Satellite Vehicle 3 (SV-3). Construction of the satellite was completed before it was required to launch, so the spacecraft was placed into storage. The U.S. Air Force later opted to launch Satellite Vehicle 4 (SV-4) first as SBIRS GEO-3, saving the cost of putting the newly-completed SV-4 into storage and additional testing that would be needed upon taking it back out.

The Atlas V, with the tail number AV-076, flew in its 411 configuration. This Atlas V configuration differs from the 401 version used for the previous three SBIRS GEO launches – which did not use any solid rocket booster (SRB). The change of configuration has ostensibly been made to ensure Centaur can be deorbited after satellite separation, helping to mitigate space debris. On previous SBIRS GEO launches, Centaur has remained in a disposal orbit, close to geostationary transfer orbit (GTO), at the end of its mission.

It was launched on 20 January 2018 from Cape Canaveral (CCAFS), atop an Atlas V 411 launch vehicle.

Mission 
The U.S. Air Force announced the satellite was operating as expected and had established initial communications with it.

References 

Spacecraft launched in 2018
Reconnaissance satellites of the United States
USA satellites
Early warning satellites
2018 in the United States